Gerling were an Australian electronica, alternative rock trio formed in 1993. From early 1997 the members were Darren Cross on guitar and lead vocals, Presser (real name Paul Towner) on drums and Burke Reid on guitar and vocals. Their second album, When Young Terrorists Chase the Sun (September 2001), reached the ARIA Albums Chart top50. It provided a top50 single, "Dust Me Selecta" (August 2001). The group disbanded in 2007.

History

Gerling were formed as a guitar pop trio in 1993 in western Sydney with the line-up of Darren Cross (aka Darren E. Spielberg-Cross) on guitar and lead vocals, Presser (real name Paul Towner) on drums and Brad Herdson on guitar and vocals. With only two guitars and drums, the group initially played cover version of W.A.S.P. material. Then they focussed on creating experimental guitar pop, with their debut single, "Sedatives for Dead Radars", issued in 1995 on Steven Stavrakis' Fellaheen label.

It was followed by a seven-track extended play, A Day of Research, in 1996. It reached No.13 on the ARIA Alternative Albums Chart. Australian musicologist, Ian McFarlane, felt it was a "mix of early Pavement-style lo-fi guitar pop and idiosyncratic backing, it garnered widespread interest among the indie cognoscenti." Some of its tracks received high rotation on national youth radio station, Triple J.

Early in 1997 Herdson left to form Sonic Emotion Explosion, with Liz Payne from Spdfgh. He was temporarily replaced in Gerling by Ben Lee for their gig at Big Day Out, Sydney, in late January. Herdson's long-term replacement, on guitar, was Canadian-born, Burke Reid. In February 1998 the group issued a four-track 7-inch EP, Bachelor Pad on the Trifekta label. The label had been partly established in the previous year by Towner.

In October 1998 they issued, "Death to the Apple Gerls", on Festival's in-house indie label Reliant – which was set up by Bruce Milne (former CEO of Au Go Go Records). In the following month they released their debut album, Children of Telepathic Experiences, which peaked at No.21 on the ARIA Alternative Albums Chart. McFarlane noticed "an entertaining mix of Gerling's live punky-pop sound and a background of layered electronica." For the first time the group incorporated electronica in their music, they also built a recording studio, Gerlog, in Alexandria where band members produced and remixed tracks.

Their next single, "Enter, Space Capsule" (April 1999), provided four versions of the song, including one at Gerlog by band members and one mixed by Josh Abrahams. McFarlane saw this as the group's "move deeper into the realms of abstract electronica." At the ARIA Music Awards of 1999 Gerling were nominated in three categories: Breakthrough Artist – Album and ARIA Award for Best Alternative Release for Children of Telepathic Experiences and Breakthrough Artist – Single for "Enter, Space Capsule". Another single, "Ghost Patrol", followed in September, which featured guest lead vocals by Naoko Matsumoto of Sydney-based group, Funky Terrorists.

During 2000 they toured the United Kingdom where they recorded, "G-House Project", with lead vocals provided by Kylie Minogue. Gerling issued a single late in the year, "The Deer in You", which peaked at No.12 on the ARIA Alternative Singles Chart. Cameron Webb of Oz Music Project described as "Hovering somewhere between the frantic mesh of screaming and guitars of 'Death to the Apple Gerls' and electro blips and beats of 'Enter, Space Capsule', 'The Deer in You' provides an enticing glimpse at their new recordings. The single doesn't suggest any great departure musically, just a reminder of what Gerling do best – pop music." At the ARIA Music Awards of 2001 they were nominated for Best Video for Paul Butler and Scott Walton's directorial work on "The Deer in You".

Gerling's second studio album, When Young Terrorists Chase the Sun, was released on 24 September 2001 after being postponed due to the September 11 attacks earlier that month and a title change to the less controversial, Head2Cleaner, for international markets. It peaked in the ARIA and New Zealand Albums Chart Top50s. Oz Music Project's Nick Coppack felt it was a "stunning follow-up", which "blends the band's love for electronic sounds and dance music with fuzzy guitars and aggressive vocals, which stem from the band's early punk roots."

The band became increasingly electronic they had success in the dance scene and mainstream charts with the earlier single, "Dust Me Selecta" (August 2001), which reached the ARIA Singles Chart Top50. Lou Lou of Oz Music Project praised it as "Keeping it fresh and funky... just when you’ve got your head around this disco funk, the booming synth voice jumps in, slaps you in the face and reminds you that it is indeed Gerling @ the controls." At the ARIA Music Awards of 2002 they received three more nominations: Best Dance Release and Best Video (directed by Jolyon Watkins) for "Dust My Selecta", and Producer of the Year for When Young Terrorists Chase the Sun (by Gerling and Magoo).

On 18 August 2003 they released their third studio album, Bad Blood!!!, which peaked in the Top60. They had recorded it at Gerlog with Magoo producing. Oz Music Project's Semone Maksimovic felt the group were "dipping their hand into the increasingly popular electro clash, disco punk bucket to fill their hands with both dirt and glitter to throw our way... [it is] more indicative of their capricious live shows, danceable, loud, catchy, energetic and easy to digest, it's a record that will go down well in clubs or to help liven up a party, even a good driving record, but one rule remains, it has to be up loud!" The album marked a return to form as guitars returned to the mix, whilst still retaining an electronic edge. The lead single, "Who's Ya Daddy?" (March 2003), reached the Top100. Maksimovic described it as "a mighty fine slice of sexy, trashy disco punk for us all to enjoy... [it] brings to mind The Detroit Grand Poobah's 'Sandwiches' am"

Their fourth studio album, 4, was released on 20 March 2006, which reached the Top100. The original recording was carried out in the function room of the Annandale Hotel, Sydney, before being re-recorded and mastered in Los Angeles. It was produced by Ethan Johns, who also worked on Aha Shake Heartbreak with Kings of Leon. "Turning the Screws" was the iTunes featured download of the week in February 2006.

The band have been on an indefinite hiatus since September 2007.

Post-hiatus

After disbandment, Cross spent four years (from 2007 to 2010) as the E.L.F., writing and performing dance music. From 2012 he turned to folk and alt-country traditional song writing structures and styling, releasing and touring as a solo artist. He received a positive review from No Depression for his album, No Damage. From that time he also performs in a folk Noir duo, Jep and Dep, with Jessica Cassar. Both acts have released EPs and albums independently. Jep and Dep's debut album, Word Got Out received 4 out of 5 stars from Sydney Morning Heralds Bernard Zuel and Rolling Stone
As of 2019, Cross has released two instrumental guitar albums under the moniker D.C Cross, Ecstatic Racquet (2019) and Terabithian (2020), Tone Deaf saying "D.C Cross’ ‘Terabithian’ is a high watermark of instrumental music".

In 2012 Cross also launched music and film production company, Bernstein Studios (Sydney) and has co-written songs with Jagwar Ma.

Towner produces visual art under the moniker, Dead Galaxy, and Reid has a career in music production.

Discography

Studio albums

Extended plays

Singles

Awards

ARIA Music Awards
The ARIA Music Awards is an annual awards ceremony that recognises excellence, innovation, and achievement across all genres of Australian music. They commenced in 1987. Gerling were nominated for ten awards.

|-
| rowspan="3"| 1999
| rowspan="2"| Children of Telepathic Experiences'
| ARIA Award for Best Adult Alternative Album
| 
|-
| ARIA Award for Breakthrough Artist - Album
| 
|-
|  "Enter, Space Capsule"
| ARIA Award for Breakthrough Artist - Single
| 
|-
| 2001
| Paul Butler and Scott Walton for Gerling "The Deer in You"
| ARIA Award for Best Video
| 
|-
| rowspan="3"| 2002
| "Dust Me Selecta"
| ARIA Award for Best Dance Release
| 
|-
| Jolyon Watkins for Gerling "Dust Me Selecta"
| Best Video
| 
|-
| Gerling and Magoo for Gerling When Young Terrorists Chase the Sun| ARIA Award for Producer of the Year
| 
|-
| rowspan="3"| 2003
| "Who's Ya Daddy?"
| Best Dance Release
| 
|-
| Paul Butler, Scott Walton & 50 / 50 Films for Gerling – "Who's Ya Daddy?"
| Best Video
| 
|-
| Gerling and Magoo for Gerling Bad Blood!!!
| Producer of the Year
| 
|-

References

Musical groups from Sydney
Flying Nun Records artists
Musical groups established in 1993
1993 establishments in Australia